Ṣanamat is a sub-district located in the Al-Misrakh District, Taiz Governorate, Yemen. Ṣanamat had a population of 5,396 according to the 2004 census.

Villages
Sanamat village.
Al-Kahlabi village.
Al-'Uqur village.
Al-Hiaj village.
Al-Mawqie village.
Al-Mahfir village.

References

Sub-districts in Al-Misrakh District